Yuanshi railway station is a station on Beijing–Guangzhou railway in Yuanshi County, Shijiazhuang, Hebei.

History 
The station was opened in 1903.

References 

Railway stations in Hebei
Stations on the Beijing–Guangzhou Railway
Railway stations in China opened in 1903